Zhang Jingwu (September 3, 1906 – October 27, 1971) was a lieutenant general of the People's Liberation Army and People's Republic of China politician. He was born in Hunan Province and his birth name was Zhang Renshan. He was Chinese Communist Party Committee Secretary of Tibet Autonomous Region from March 1952 to September 1965.

References

1906 births
1971 deaths
Delegates to the 7th National Congress of the Chinese Communist Party
Hakka generals
People's Republic of China politicians from Hunan
People's Liberation Army generals from Hunan
People from Zhuzhou